Algerian Judo Federation (FAJ) is the governing body of Judo in Algeria, and a member of the world governing body, the International Judo Federation (IJF), and the African Judo Union. JSA is also a member of the Algerian Olympic and Sport Committee (COA).

References

External links
 Official website

Judo
1964 establishments in Algeria
Sports organizations established in 1964
National members of the International Judo Federation
Judo in Algeria